Eyre & Spottiswoode was the London-based printing firm established in 1739 that was the King's Printer, and subsequently, a publisher prior to being incorporated; it once went by the name of Spottiswoode, Ballantyne & co. ltd. In April 1929, it was incorporated as Eyre & Spottiswoode (Publishers) Ltd.. It became part of Associated Book Publishers in 1958 and merged with Methuen in the 1970s with the resulting company known as Eyre Methuen.

History

In the 19th century, the firm had a printing works at Shacklewell. The firm was re-appointed King's Printer after the accession of King Edward VII in May 1901.

Douglas Jerrold became a director in 1929, when it incorporated as a publishing house, became chairman in 1945, and retired in 1958. Between 1944 and 1948, Graham Greene was his director, in charge of developing its fiction list. Greene created The Century Library series, which was discontinued after he left following a conflict with Jerrold regarding Anthony Powell's contract. In 1958, Greene was offered the position of chairman by Oliver Crosthwaite-Eyre, but declined.

"The Printers' Battalion"
The 2nd City of London Rifle Volunteer Corps was founded in 1860 as one of many such regiments raised in response to an invasion scare. Recruited in the Fleet Street area, largely from Eyre & Spottiswoode's printing works, it was known as "the Printers' Battalion". Among the first officers to be commissioned into the unit were George A. Spottiswoode and William Spottiswoode. When the unit became the 6th Battalion London Regiment (City of London Rifles) in the new Territorial Force in 1908, G Company was still mainly recruited from the company's employees.

The Protocols of the Elders of Zion

In 1920, the firm was the first in the United Kingdom to print a translation of the notorious antisemitic text The Protocols of the Elders of Zion, with the additional title The Jewish Peril. Norman Cohn points out that a distinction is to be made between the printer and the publisher of the same name. The book, or rather pamphlet, shows it was printed by "EYRE & SPOTTISWOODE, LTD.". It seems that this edition of the Protocols was printed to private commission and therefore bears the imprint of the printers, Eyre & Spottiswoode Ltd[.], instead of a publisher's imprint. The firm of Eyre & Spottiswoode (Publishers) Ltd was not founded until April 1929.

Book series
 The Century Library
 Country Library
 Highways to the Sun
 How to Play Series
 The Kew Series
 Keystone Library
 Modern Writers and Playwrights
 The Practitioner Handbooks
 The Regions of Britain

References

Sources 

 Ian F. W. Beckett, Riflemen Form: A study of the Rifle Volunteer Movement 1859–1908, Aldershot: Ogilby Trusts, 1982, .
 Capt E. G. Godfrey, The "Cast Iron Sixth": A History of the Sixth Battalion London Regiment (The City of London Rifles), London: Old Comrades' Association, 1935//Uckfield: Naval & Military Press, 2002, .
 Ray Westlake, Tracing the Rifle Volunteers, Barnsley: Pen and Sword, 2010, .
 Norman Cohn, Warrant for Genocide (London: Serif, 1996).

Further reading
 R. A. Austen-Leigh, The Story of a Printing House, 2nd edition, 1912.

 Eyre and Spottiswoode, Grace's Guide to British Industrial History. 

Book publishing companies of the United Kingdom
Protocols of the Elders of Zion
British companies established in 1739
Publishing companies established in the 1730s
1739 establishments in England
English printers